Yunnanilus pleurotaenia is a species of stone loach, family Nemacheilidae. It is endemic to Yunnan in southern China. It is known with certainty from Dian Lake and the associated streams; similar fish reported from other lakes might or might not refer to this species. It grows to  SL.

References

P
Freshwater fish of China
Endemic fauna of Yunnan
Taxa named by Charles Tate Regan
Fish described in 1904